Adv. V. Joy (born May 10, 1965) is a member of 15th Kerala Legislative Assembly. He represents Varkala constituency. He defeated BRM Shefeer by 17821 votes in his second term. He is the current secretary of CPI (M) Thiruvanadapuram district committee and State Committee Member of Communist Party of India (Marxist), Kerala.

Education and Political career 

Chirayinkeezhu Sreechithira Vilasam School Leader, Chempazhanthi SN College University Union Councilor, University of Kerala Union Executive Member, Senate Member, SFI District President, District Secretary, DYFI District Vice President. Proved excellence in performance. Contested the Grama Panchayat of Azhoor twice and became the President twice. He then contested the Chirayinkeezhu Block Panchayat and was elected President. Later Member of the Thiruvananthapuram District Panchayat.

He is currently the State President of the Kerala Primary Cooperative Societies Association.  He has been a Member of the Board of Directors of the District Co-operative Bank and Vice President of the State Co-operative Bank, Kumaranasan Memorial Governing Board Member, President of the Perumkuzhi Service Co-operative Bank.

Joy had contested the uncertain Varkala constituency in 2016, capturing more than 2,000 votes and capturing the constituency with a majority of 17,821 in the second round. Considering this fighting spirit, Joy was elected as a member of the CPM  state committee.

References

Living people
Kerala MLAs 2016–2021
Politicians from Thiruvananthapuram
1965 births